Hrachya Poladian (Armenian: Հրաչյա Արշակի Փոլադյան) (born May 16, 1971) is the 3-rd Ambassador Extraordinary and Plenipotentiary of Armenia to Iraq. Mr. Hrachya Poladian, a career member of the Armenian Foreign Service, was appointed Ambassador of Armenia to Iraq by the presidential decree on October 25, 2018. On November 29, 2019 Foreign Minister of Iraq Mohamad A. Alhakim received copy of the credentials of Ambassador Mr. Hrachya Poladian, the new Ambassador of Armenia to Baghdad and discussed the bilateral relations between the two countries and means of enhancing them to serve the interests of the two friendly peoples.

Biography 
Poladian was born in 1971 in Yerevan, the capital of Armenia, in the family of the prominent Armenian diplomat, historian, orientalist and author Arshak Poladian. He holds a master's degree in Arabic studies from the Faculty of Oriental Studies, Yerevan State University. From 1992 to 1994 Poladian spent two years in the Faculty of Arts, Aleppo University as an exchange student working on his paper "Metaphors in Kheir ad-Dine al-Assadi encyclopedia". After the graduation from high school, Poladian worked as an Arabic typesetter at the printing house of the Armenian Academy of Sciences (1987–1988). Beside his native Armenian, he speaks Russian, English and Arabic. Poladian is married to Mrs Zara Balaian and they have two sons.

Diplomatic service 
Poladian started his diplomatic career in 1993 as a consular officer at the Armenian Consulate General in Aleppo, Syria. His assignments abroad included two years as the second secretary of  Armenian Embassy in Damascus (1998-99), followed by a term as the second secretary of the Armenian Consulate General in Aleppo (1999-2001). Later he has once again served as the First secretary at the Armenian Embassy in Damascus (2002-06), and also as Counselor, Deputy Chief of Mission at the Armenian Embassy in Egypt (2008-11).

Prior to assuming his current position as Armenian Ambassador to Iraq, Hrachya Poladian served as the Head of the Middle East, North African (MENA) Arab Countries & Israel Division at the Ministry of Foreign Affairs from 2012 to October 25, 2018. In that capacity he was in charge of policy formulation and implementation of bilateral political, economic and cultural exchanges with the countries of the specified region. Besides, at the headquarters in Yerevan he held a couple of other positions as Head of the Information Division, Policy Planning Department (2006-08),  second secretary at the Middle East department (2001-02), third secretary at the Europe Department (1996-98) as well as Diplomatic attaché both at the Press (1995-96) and Policy Planning departments (1994-95).

Ambassador Poladian holds a diplomatic rank of First Class Councellor.

Honors and awards 

 2016: Medal of Honor from the Minister of Foreign Affairs.

External links 

 Official biography of Ambassador Hrachya Poladian (in Armenian)

References 

Living people
Diplomats from Yerevan
Ambassadors of Armenia to Iraq
Yerevan State University alumni
1971 births